Delta Regina Hotel is a hotel building located at 1919 Saskatchewan Drive in the Central Business District of Regina, Saskatchewan, Canada. The hotel contains 274 rooms and was completed in 1988; at 25 stories (83.8 m). The hotel opened as a Ramada Renaissance, but is now part of the Delta Hotels chain.  Similar in design to Saskatoon's Radisson Hotel and La Renaissance Apartments.

The building is connected with the Saskatchewan Trade and Convention Centre, Casino Regina, Cornwall Centre shopping centre and Palliser Place seniors' highrise.

See also
 List of tallest buildings in Regina, Saskatchewan

References

Buildings and structures in Regina, Saskatchewan
Hotels in Saskatchewan
Hotel buildings completed in 1988
Hotels established in 1988
1988 establishments in Saskatchewan
Marriott International